Turkey in the Straw may refer to:

"Turkey in the Straw", a folk song
Turkey in the Straw: A Book of American Ballads and Primitive Verse, a 1935 collection of stories by MacKinlay Kantor
"Turkey in the Straw", 1942 recording by Carson Robison
 Turkey in the Straw, a 1942 soundie starring Freddie Fisher